Live Ai (stylized LIVE A.I.) is the first live album by Japanese-American singer-songwriter Ai, released on March 7, 2007 by Island Records and Universal Sigma. The album primarily consists of songs and performances from Ai's final performance at Nippon Budokan, but also other various tour dates within Japan from Ai's What's Goin' On Ai tour. The album was reissued on December 5, 2012 by USM Japan.

Background and release 
To promote her fifth studio album, Ai embarked on the What's Goin' On Ai tour in Japan. The tour initially featured 11 dates across the country in November and December 2006. An extra date was added on December 13, where Ai performed at the Nippon Budokan stadium in Tokyo to 12,000 people.

A DVD was released on March 28, 2007 titled Nippon Budokan Ai shortly after the release of the live album.

Track listing 
All tracks written by Ai Uemura unless noted.

Personnel 
Credits adapted from Tidal.

 Ai Uemura – lead vocals (all tracks), lyricist (1–10, 12–13)
 Tremaine Neverson – featured artist, lyricist (12)
 DJ Watari – composer (1)
 DJ Yutaka – composer (2, 5)
 Desert Storm – composer (3)
 Lofey – composer (3)
 Skane – composer (3)
 2 Soul – composer, (4, 10)
 Kazunori Fujimoto – composer (6)
 Carsten Lindberg – composer (7)
 Emanuel Officer – composer (7)
 Joachim A. Svare – composer (7)
 T-Kura – composer (8, 9)
 Ryuichi Sakamoto – composer, lyricist (11)
 Stephanie Stokes Fountain – composer (13)

Charts

Release history

References 

2007 live albums
Universal Music Group live albums
Island Records live albums
Ai (singer) live albums